Banana Club (正牌香蕉俱樂部) is a 1996 Hong Kong film directed by Sin Chi-Wai.

Banana Club is a romantic comedy about 3 radio DJs who search for love within their own radio station.

Cast and roles
 Simon Lui - Yue Yeung
 Michael Chow - Mai Go
 Edmond Leung - Hiu Fung
 Pauline Suen - Vee
 Halina Tam
 Amanda Lee
 Alvina Kong Yan-Yin
 Cheung Tat-ming
 Chan Ga-Bik
 Ben Lam Kwok-Bun
 Emily Kwan Bo-Wai
 Joey Leung Wing-Chung
 Thomas Lam Cho-Fai
 Stephen Au
 Daniel Chan
 Raymond Wong
 Julian Cheung
 Dang Siu-Juen
 Tats Lau Yi-Dat
 Nelson Cheung Hok-Yun
 Money Lo
 Nnadia Chan (cameo)

Crew
 Director: Sin Chi-Wai
 Editor: Choi Hung
 Script Supervisor: Fung Oi-Lei
 Cinematographer: Tony Miu King-Fai
 Art Director: Wilson Lam Wai-Sum
 Costume Designer: Rick Chin
 Sound Recordist: Hoh Ging-Man

External links
 
 HK cinemagic entry

1996 films
Hong Kong romantic comedy films
1990s Hong Kong films